Gamasitus is a genus of mites in the family Ologamasidae.

Species
 Gamasitus obscurus Womersley, 1956

References

Ologamasidae